Withernsea railway station is a disused railway station that was the terminus of the North Eastern Railway's Hull and Holderness Railway in Withernsea, East Riding of Yorkshire, England. It was opened by the Hull and Holderness Railway on 27 June 1854. 

The station was closed to passengers on 19 October 1964.

References

External links
 
 

Disused railway stations in the East Riding of Yorkshire
Railway stations in Great Britain opened in 1854
Railway stations in Great Britain closed in 1964
Former North Eastern Railway (UK) stations
Beeching closures in England
Hull and Holderness Railway
Withernsea
Cuthbert Brodrick buildings